Lee Woo-young (Hangul: 이우영, born 19 August 1973) is South Korean football manager and former player. He played for South Korean under-23 team as a forward in the 1996 Summer Olympics. He retired early as a player at the age of 26 due to a knee injury. After his retirement, he coached Keio University from 2003 to 2010 (became a head coach since 2007) and Japanese Universiade team in 2013. He is a coach and a professor of Senshu University since 2012.

Notes

References

External links

Lee Woo-young at KFA 

1973 births
Living people
Association football forwards
South Korean footballers
South Korea international footballers
South Korean expatriate footballers
South Korean football managers
Oita Trinita players
FC Seoul players
K League 1 players
Expatriate footballers in Japan
South Korean expatriate sportspeople in Japan
Footballers at the 1996 Summer Olympics
Olympic footballers of South Korea
Association football midfielders